George Cobham may refer to:
George A. Cobham Jr. (1825–1864), American Civil War officer
George Brooke, 9th Baron Cobham (c. 1497–1558)
George Brooke alias Cobham, MP for Portsmouth